Lagelu is a Local Government Area in Oyo State, Nigeria. Its headquarters are in the town of Iyana Offa.

It has an area of 338 km and a population of 147,957 at the 2006 census.

Lagelu local government area is subdivided into 14 wards: Ajara/Opeodu, Apatere/Kuffi/Ogunbode/Ogo, Arulogun Ehin/Kelebe, Ejioku/Igbon/Ariku, Lagelu Market/Kajola/Gbena, Lagun, Lalupon I, Lalupon II, Lalupon III, Ofa-Igbo, Ogunjana/Olowode/Ogburo, Ogunremi/Ogunsina, Oyedeji/Olode/Kutayi, Sagbe/Pabiekun. 
The village called Eleruko also falls under this local government.
The local government is governed by an elected chairman and 14 councillors, one elected from each ward.

The postal code of the area is 200.

References

Oyo:Agbegbe Ijoba Ibile Lagelu

Local Government Areas in Oyo State
Local Government Areas in Yorubaland